Events in the year 1960 in the People's Republic of China.

Incumbents 
 Chairman of the Chinese Communist Party – Mao Zedong
 President of the People's Republic of China – Liu Shaoqi
 Premier of the People's Republic of China – Zhou Enlai
 Chairman of the National People's Congress – Zhu De
 Vice President of the People's Republic of China – Soong Ching-ling and Dong Biwu
 Vice Premier of the People's Republic of China – Chen Yun

Governors  
 Governor of Anhui Province – Huang Yan
 Governor of Fujian Province – Wu Hongxiang (starting unknown)
 Governor of Gansu Province – Deng Baoshan
 Governor of Guangdong Province – Chen Yu 
 Governor of Guizhou Province – Zhou Lin (politician)
 Governor of Hebei Province – Liu Zihou 
 Governor of Heilongjiang Province – Li Fanwu
 Governor of Henan Province – Wu Zhipu 
 Governor of Hubei Province – Zhang Tixue 
 Governor of Hunan Province – Cheng Qian 
 Governor of Jiangsu Province – Hui Yuyu 
 Governor of Jiangxi Province – Shao Shiping 
 Governor of Jilin Province – Li Youwen 
 Governor of Liaoning Province – Huang Oudong 
 Governor of Qinghai Province – Yang Renyuan
 Governor of Shaanxi Province – Zhao Boping 
 Governor of Shandong Province – Tan Qilong 
 Governor of Shanxi Province – Wei Heng 
 Governor of Sichuan Province – Li Dazhang
 Governor of Yunnan Province – Ding Yichuan
 Governor of Zhejiang Province – Zhou Jianren

Events

February
 February 11 – Twelve Indian soldiers die in clashes with Red Chinese troops along their small common border.

May
 May 9 – According to Chinese government official confirmed report, a Datong Laobaidong Coal mine gas explosion in Shanxi Province, 220 workers were rescued, 684 workers were perished.

June
 June 9 – Typhoon "Mary" kills 1,600 people in the Fukien province of China.

See also 
 1960 in Chinese film

References 

 
1960s in China
Years of the 20th century in China
China
China